= Allen Howard =

American entrepreneur

Allen Howard (born 1953) is an American entrepreneur that co-founded NuTech Energy Alliance, LTD in 1997. Based in Houston, Texas, NuTech is a Reservoir Intelligence company that services the upstream Oil and Gas industry.
